Albert Blagdon Reitman (9 October 1887 – 12 May 1973) was an Australian rules footballer who played for the Collingwood Football Club in the Victorian Football League (VFL), and for the Williamstown Football Club in the Victorian Football Association (VFA).

Family
The son of Theodore "Fred" Reitman (1863-1934), and Effie Amelia Reitman (1865-1927), née Purling, Albert Blagdon Reitman was born in Collingwood, Victoria on 9 October 1887.

He married Gertrude Evelyn Marshall (1888-1970) in 1913.

Football
One of the finest men who have [donned] a football guernsey, to wit, Bert Reitman, of the Williamstown club, has signified his intention of retiring. Always a fair and manly player, Bert was an ornament to the game, admired by all the players of other teams, and his loss will be very noticeable. The Flemington Spectator, 11 March 1915.

Collingwood (VFL)
He played his last senior match for Collingwood on 4 May 1907, against St Kilda.

Williamstown (VFA)
Cleared from Collingwood to the VFA team Williamstown, he played his first match for Williamstown, against Brunswick, on 25 May 1907.

He was captain-coach of Williamstown in 1913 and its captain in 1914.

Recognition
He was made a life member of the Williamstown Football Club in 1915.

Death
He died (suddenly) at his home in Williamstown on 12 May 1973.

Notes

References

External links 

 
 
 Albert Reitman profile at The VFA project.
 Bert Reitman's profile at Collingwood Forever

1887 births
1973 deaths
Australian rules footballers from Melbourne
Collingwood Football Club players
People from Collingwood, Victoria
People from Williamstown, Victoria
Williamstown Football Club coaches
Williamstown Football Club players